"Rendezvous at Sunset" may refer to: 

 "Rendezvous at Sunset", song by Stan Kenton from the album Back to Balboa
 "Rendezvous at Sunset", song by Kylie Minogue, B-side to "Can't Get You Out of My Head"